Pyotr Kozmich Frolov (– ) was a Russian mining engineer and inventor who built the first horse-railway in the Russian Empire in 1809. He elaborated on various canal projects and other artificial water constructions. Frolov also contributed to the development of scientific research and to the culture of the Altay region. His activities as a head of the Kolyvano-Voskresensk factories promoted a great advance of Russian technology in the beginning of the 20th century.

1775 births
1839 deaths
Inventors from the Russian Empire
People from Tomsk Governorate
Russian mining engineers
Saint Petersburg Mining University alumni
Senators of the Russian Empire